The Barley Mow (Roud 944) is a cumulative song celebrated in the traditions of folk music of England, Ireland, and Scotland. William Chappell transcribed the lyrics in his two-volume work The Ballad Literature and Popular Music of the Olden Time (1855).

"The Barley Mow" has become a drinking song sung while comrades empty their glasses. In one "Barley Mow" drinking game, any participant who fails to sing the song's (progressively expanding) refrain in a single breath must drink. In another, participants drink just after singing the second line in each verse ("Good luck to the barley mow"); if one's glass is not empty by the final verse, one must finish the drink after singing the line.

A barley mow is a stack (mow) of barley, especially barley that was cultivated and then harvested. Barley is a grain that is commonly malted for brewing beer.

Lyrics

The verses of "The Barley Mow" wish good luck to various sizes of vessels of alcoholic beverages, and lastly to the barley mow, a venerable reserve of one of beer's key ingredients. Later verses supplement this list with roles and occupations associated with beer, from brewing, to distribution, to serving in public houses, to drinking. Each verse wishes good luck to a new subject, which is then added to the beginning of the litany recited in the second line of the refrain.

The song has several variations. 
The 12 terms between landlord and round bowl are English units—particularly units used to measure the volume of alcoholic beverages. These are sung in descending order from largest (barrel) to smallest (round bowl). Round bowl (sometimes sung brown bowl) indicates either a humble, wooden bowl, or a person's hands cupped together into the shape of a bowl. It can also refer to the small bowl suspended from the tap in a beer barrel that catches the drips.

Company refers to the party of people gathered together singing the song. A slavey is a female servant, who assists in the brewing process. A drayer is a person who transports heavy loads of goods (such as barrels of beer) in a type of horse-drawn cart called a dray.

References

Further reading
The Folk Handbook: Working with Songs from the English Tradition. Backbeat Books. pp. 94–96.  (includes music and lyrics)

Drinking songs
Irish folk songs
Year of song unknown
Cumulative songs